Styphlodromus bicolor is a species of beetle in the family Carabidae, the only species in the genus Styphlodromus.

References

Brachininae